The Institute of Public Administration and Management (IPAM) is an institute of the University of Sierra Leone. It operates like other constituent colleges of the University of Sierra Leone, under the authority of the University Senate and the University Court. IPAM is in the centre of Freetown at AJ Momoh Street, Tower Hill, close to the British Council, Statistics Sierra Leone, the West African Examination Council (WAEC) and the National Fire Force headquarters.  The institute has four departments offering a range of business, information technology, finance and public administration courses to the public.

Establishment

The establishment of IPAM can be traced to 1970. It came as a result of a government white paper on education which proposed the closure of the Civil Service Training College. The responsibility for the training of middle- and upper-level staff was transferred to Fourah Bay College and that of the clerical cadre to the Freetown Technical Institute.

Subsequent review by the World Bank suggested the need for a more specialised establishment in public administration and management. Discussions between the World Bank and the government of Sierra Leone resulted in the decision to establish the Institute of Public Administration and Management as an institute of the University of Sierra Leone.

Funds were made available under the Second IDA Education Project for construction of suitable accommodation for the institute. The building on the site of the then Civil Service Training College was occupied in June 1980 and the institute started work in the 1980/81 academic year.

Management

The institute is managed by a dean of campus (formerly director) who reports directly to the vice-chancellor and principal of the University of Sierra Leone. A management team comprises the dean of campus, assistant dean of campus, deputy registrar and all heads of departments (administrative and academic).

Faculties and Departments

Applied Accounting
Financial Services
Business Administration and Entrepreneurship
Banking and Finance
Public Sector Management
Information System and Technology
Governance and Leadership

Functions

The main functions of the institute include:

 Offering courses leading to the award of certificates, diplomas and degrees of the University of Sierra Leone;
 Designing and organizing management training courses and programmes for personnel in the public and private sectors and NGOs;
 Organising conferences, workshops and seminars;
 General management, financial management and banking, human resource management, procurement and logistic, public policy, organisational effectiveness and capacity building, basic office skills, entrepreneurship, marketing management and information technology;
 Providing advisory and consultancy services on aspects of management, finance and administration;
 Carrying out studies, enquiries and research in its areas of competence either independently or in collaboration with interested parties; and
 Conducting tests and other evaluation exercises for both the public and private sector organisations.

Universities and colleges in Sierra Leone
Education in Freetown
1980s establishments in Sierra Leone

de:University of Sierra Leone
ja:フォーラー・ベイ・カレッジ